Zanoletti is an Italian surname. Notable people with the surname include:

Costanza Zanoletti (born 1980), Italian skeleton racer
Gilberto Zanoletti (born 1980), Italian footballer

Italian-language surnames
Patronymic surnames
Surnames from given names